North Vancouver-Seymour is a provincial electoral district for the Legislative Assembly of British Columbia, Canada.

For other current and historical North Shore and City of Vancouver ridings, please see Vancouver (electoral districts)

Geography

History 
For most of history, North Vancouver- Seymour had elected centre- centre-right candidates excluding 1972-1975 when the NDP won. The current MLA is Susie Chant, who was elected in the 2020 Provincial Election. Chant's election coincided with an Orange wave that saw prominent BC Liberals defeated, including incumbent Jane Thornthwaite.

Election results 

|-

|}

|-

|-
 
|NDP
|Cathy Pinsent
|align="right"|7,595
|align="right"|29.78%
|align="right"|
|align="right"|$18,913

|}

|-

|-

 
|NDP
|Sheila Paterson
|align="right"|2,751
|align="right"|11.51%
|align="right"|
|align="right"|$4,981

|Independent
|Chris McKenzie
|align="right"|209
|align="right"|0.87%
|align="right"|
|align="right"|$250

|}

|-

|-
 
|NDP
|Michelle Kemper
|align="right"|6,676
|align="right"|26.56%
|align="right"|
|align="right"|$14,030

|Natural Law
|Deborah Rubin
|align="right"|44
|align="right"|0.18%
|align="right"|
|align="right"|$133

|}

|-

 
|NDP
|Dominique Roelants
|align="right"|7,126
|align="right"|29.89%
|align="right"|
|align="right"|$25,273
|-

|}

References

External links 
BC Stats Profile - 2001 (pdf)
Results of 2001 election (pdf)
2001 Expenditures
Results of 1996 election
1996 Expenditures
Results of 1991 election
1991 Expenditures
Website of the Legislative Assembly of British Columbia

British Columbia provincial electoral districts
North Vancouver (district municipality)
Provincial electoral districts in Greater Vancouver and the Fraser Valley